The Church Baronetcy, of Woodside in the Parish of Bishop's Hatfield in the County of Hertford, of Belshill in the Parish of Bamborough in the County of Northumberland, and of Harley Street in the Borough of Saint Marylebone in the County of London, was a title in the Baronetage of the United Kingdom. It was created on 28 June 1901 for William Selby Church, President of the Royal College of Physicians from 1899 to 1905. Sir William was further honoured when he was appointed a Knight Commander of the Order of the Bath (KCB) in 1902.

The second baronet was awarded the Military Cross in 1918, and was appointed a Commander of the Order of the British Empire (CBE) in 1940. Sir Geoffrey was appointed an additional Aide de Camp to King George VI in 1941.

The title became extinct on the death of the second Baronet in 1979.

Church baronets, of Woodside, Belshill and Harley Street (1901)
Sir William Selby Church, 1st Baronet (1837–1928)
Sir Geoffrey Selby Church, 2nd Baronet (1887–1979)

References

Extinct baronetcies in the Baronetage of the United Kingdom